Cypriot–Georgian relations are foreign relations between Cyprus and Georgia. After the dissolution of the Soviet Union, Cyprus recognized the independence of Georgia in December 1991. The formal Protocol on the Establishment of Diplomatic Relations between the two countries was signed in 1992 and the relations were established on July 9, 1993. Cyprus is represented in Georgia through its embassy in Athens (Greece). Georgia opened an embassy in 2005 in Nicosia and the current ambassador, Vladimir Konstindinidi, presented his credentials in 2009.

The two countries have signed a trade agreement that went into force on November 22, 1998. Both countries are full members of the Council of Europe, the Organization for Security and Co-operation in Europe  and the World Trade Organization.

See also
Foreign relations of Cyprus
Foreign relations of Georgia

References

External links
 Cyprus Ministry of Foreign affairs: list of bilateral treaties with Georgia
 Georgian Ministry of Foreign Affairs about the relations with Cyprus

 
Georgia
Bilateral relations of Georgia (country)